Mentosaurus is an extinct genus of prehistoric amphibian. It lived around 247-242 million years ago.

See also
 Prehistoric amphibian
 List of prehistoric amphibians
 Mentosaurus (Mindat)

Prehistoric amphibians